Trapster (Peter Petruski), also known as Paste-Pot Pete, is a supervillain appearing in American comic books published by Marvel Comics.

Publication history

The character is one of the first supervillains who became active during the "Silver Age" of Marvel Comics. He makes his first appearance as Paste-Pot Pete in Strange Tales #104 (January 1963), and as the Trapster in Fantastic Four #38.

Fictional character biography

Peter Petruski was born in Gary, Indiana. Originally calling himself Paste-Pot Pete, the villain and professional criminal clashed with the Human Torch during his efforts to sell a new American missile to the Soviets. However he escaped by using his paste to catch the wing of a plane, then diving into the sea.

Following a failed solo effort against Human Torch, Paste-Pot Pete broke out of jail and teamed with the Wizard in efforts to trump his youthful foe. However Paste-Pot Pete was angered over Wizard acting as the team's leader. Wizard framed Human Torch for a robbery. They got Human Torch to Wizard's house and used compressed air to force him into a chamber of steel mirrors, planning to fill the place with a gas that would cut off the oxygen supply of the Torch. However, Human Torch melted through the paste that held him to the floor, created a flaming duplicate to fool the two, then increased his flame enabling him to burn through the mirrors. The villains only realized this deception when the fake Human Torch faded away due to the gas, by which time Human Torch had regained his flame and captured the two in a flaming ring.

To free some Avengers who were trapped in place by an attack by Baron Zemo with Adhesive X, Pete provided the team with a solvent of his own formulation to dissolve it, and was paroled from prison. He adopted a new costume and weaponry, and battled Human Torch and the Thing using new paste types. He captured Thing, then Human Torch, but was still defeated. Wizard and Pete would eventually team with the criminal Sandman and the Inhuman Medusa as the Frightful Four to battle the Fantastic Four. It was shortly after the formation of the Frightful Four that Pete abandoned his old alias and assumed the more intimidating name Trapster (the Spider-Man/Human Torch miniseries depicts the catalyst of the name change to be Spider-Man being unable to stop laughing when Paste-Pot Pete introduced himself). The Frightful Four would clash time and again with the Fantastic Four, often enjoying some measure of success in their efforts. Over the years, the membership of the Frightful Four would vary, but the man once known as Paste-Pot Pete would serve in virtually every incarnation in which Wizard served as well, loyal to his longtime boss.

He changed his nom de crime to the Trapster and appeared with new weaponry in Fantastic Four #38, with the second appearance of the Frightful Four, in an attempt to make himself sound more formidable. In this encounter, the Frightful Four was able to defeat the Fantastic Four. Over the years, a running gag in Marvel Comics involved heroes and villains alike reminding Trapster of his earlier name of "Paste-Pot Pete" — which would inevitably send him flying into a rage. A chance encounter with Balder once prevented the Frightful Four's takeover of Fantastic Four headquarters. With the Frightful Four, he soon battled the Fantastic Four again, and then battled Daredevil. He was hired by the Red Skull to acquire information from Sharon Carter, and battled Captain America. Alongside Wizard and Sandman, he later battled Medusa. Together with Wizard, Sandman, and Medusa as the Frightful Four again, they once again battled the Fantastic Four.

Trapster has often sought independent recognition, battling virtually every "street-level" hero in the Marvel Universe either by design or by opposition to some criminal scheme. Trapster once even defeated Daredevil in single combat. The victory proved short-lived, as Doctor Doom interrupted his fight in a campaign of his own against Daredevil, and shortly thereafter the hero would avenge his defeat. Trapster also attempted to raid the Baxter Building  (just before it was destroyed by the second Doctor Doom) while the Fantastic Four were away participating in the Secret Wars, but embarrassingly fell victim to the security systems and the robot receptionist, thus becoming the first villain to be defeated by an empty building. However, he had a moment appreciated by the heroes when he was convinced to free Captain America and Giant-Man who were snared by Heinrich Zemo's powerful Adhesive X, by inventing the first ever means to neutralize the previously uncounterable chemical.

Saddened by constant defeats, Trapster would seek out the Tinkerer's aid in redesigning his arsenal. Adding wrist-pumps for his glue weaponry and a bandolier of various explosives and gimmicks, Trapster joined forces with the mutant villain Whirlwind in a bid to defeat Captain America. Despite his improved arsenal, both villains were defeated.

The Trapster found his moment of victory over Spider-Man when he teamed up with the Shocker but, before the duo could finish Spider-Man off, their employers said their payment would be doubled if they left Spider-Man alone and they complied. He would later defeat Spider-Man in one-on-one combat after being enlisted to battle the wall-crawler as part of the "Acts of Vengeance" conspiracy; it was only through the merest quirk of fate that Spider-Man even survived the battle. However, when the Trapster learned of Spider-Man's survival and returned to finish the job, he would find the web-slinger now in possession of cosmic powers (eventually revealed to be a manifestation of the Uni-Power) with which Trapster was easily defeated.

Later on, during the Identity Crisis story, Trapster would be hired by Norman Osborn to kill a man and make it seem like Spider-Man did it, and, in order to cover this up, Osborn put a price on Trapster's head, attracting assassins like the Hand and his previous ally Shocker. Trapster unknowingly teamed up with Spider-Man - now using the Dusk alias-reasoning that the currently-lone Trapster would need an ally and someone to talk to in his currently vulnerable state—in an attempt to get back at Osborn, and would eventually confess his murder to the police in order to remove Osborn's reason for wanting him dead (although he kept the identity of his employer secret in case he needed it later).

During his tenure with a later Frightful Four incarnation (including Hydro-Man and the mysterious Salamandra), Wizard, tired of Trapster's failures and his general sniveling, callously sealed the villain in a repeating time-loop, a trap from which he can "never escape." However, Petruski did indeed escape.

During the Secret War storyline, Trapster was enlisted by Lucia von Bardas, the former prime minister of Latveria, and placed in her secret army of technology-based villains. She sent the army against Wolverine, Spider-Man, Luke Cage, Daredevil, and Captain America, the five heroes Nick Fury had sent to Latveria to stop Lucia’s secret criminal funding. When the battle started to turn in favor of the heroes, Lucia turned all the armor of her technological army into a bomb. Nick’s unknown agent Daisy defeated her and the armor army’s lives were saved. Trapster escaped the heroes in the resulting battle between Fury and Wolverine.

During the "Civil War" storyline, Trapster was seen as a member of the Sinister Six. He was later among an army of supervillains organized by Hammerhead that was captured by Iron Man and S.H.I.E.L.D.

After the Civil War, Trapster appeared as a member of a new 'Frightful Five', along with Wizard, Hydro-Man, Titania, and Klaw.

He appeared in Brand New Day as one of the villains in the bar, and later fighting Spider-Man in the Brand New Day Extra one-shot.

During the Dark Reign storyline, Trapster later showed up in an alliance with the criminal Zodiac.

Trapster was with the Frightful Four when they were sent by Intelligencia to attack the Baxter Building and capture Mister Fantastic.

After MODOK Superior had revived the other Intelligencia members following the fight with the Sinister Six, he makes room for Trapster to join up with them. Their meeting was interrupted by Deadpool (who tried to sink the ship they were on) only for Trapster to defeat Deadpool.

When Peter Parker (in Doctor Octopus' dying body) sends a message to various supervillains to capture Otto Octavius (in Spider-Man's body) alive in order bring to the Raft, Trapster is among the supervillains that receives the message. Trapster places who he believes to be Doctor Octopus in a portable life-support system that he had put together. Trapster teleports Peter, Hydro-Man, and Scorpion to one of Doctor Octopus' hideouts and then asks for the pay. But Peter reminds them that they have to capture Spider-Man alive and bring before "Doctor Octopus" (in order to find a way to switch Peter's and Otto's minds back). Trapster was later found webbed up at the hideout by the police with a note stating "Courtesy of your friendly neighborhood Doc Ock".

At a supervillain nightclub as part of the All-New, All-Different Marvel, Trapster encountered his sometime-teammate in the Frightful Four Titania who addresses him as "Paste-Pot Pete". He ambushes Titania in an alley outside, attempting to rob her, but Titania easily defeats him.

During the Avengers: Standoff! storyline, Trapster was an inmate of Pleasant Hill, a gated community established by S.H.I.E.L.D. Using the Kobik project, S.H.I.E.L.D. transformed Trapster into a mild-mannered Pleasant Hill groundskeeper named Willie. Helmut Zemo and Fixer restored his memory and he helped to assault a S.H.I.E.L.D. outpost that was used as the Pleasant Hill City Hall.

Skills and equipment
The Trapster does not possess any superpowers, but relies on a variety of technological devices. He designed a costume of synthetic stretch fabric equipped with storage canisters for adhesives or lubricants, as well as paste-rigged boots and gloves to cling onto surfaces. His primary weapon has always been projectile glue, initially delivered by a pistol connected by an armored tubing to the container worn at his hip, then wrist-mounted cannons, and eventually shot straight from the glove tips. He shoots out streams of liquid gel that immediately forms into a springy rope, enabling Pete to duplicate Spider-Man's webbing (to the point where he is only one person Spider-Man knows who could even replicate an approximate copy of his webs). He was able to create a fire-proof paste. Pete also designed boots that allows him to walk upon walls by sequentially releasing a powerful glue and then, lubricant. Trapster has created solvents that can render any surface frictionless and discovered a way to dissolve the extremely strong "Adhesive X" concocted by Heinrich Zemo. He has also created a dust capable of rendering Mister Fantastic's unstable molecules inert. Trapster is an expert chemist, a skilled marksman, and talented disguise artist. Pete could use other devices, such as anti-gravity discs, explosive caps, ultrasonic transmitters, a floating platform, and various mechanical traps to bind his opponents.

Other characters named Trapster

Larry Curtiss
Lawrence "Larry" Curtiss is a different version of Trapster that appeared in Iron Man Annual #12. Known as "Trapster", he was the assistant head of security for the Roxxon Oil Company and stole Peter Petruski's costume and weapons. He also had heat-seeking mini-missiles equipped with concussion charges and glue missiles (fired from paste-shooters). He used the Trapster's equipment to steal the inventions programs from Iron Man and desired to replace his boss as the head of security at Roxxon. However, he was discovered by his boss and defeated by Iron Man.

Third Trapster
A third Trapster crashed a battle between Spider-Man and Vulture who was using the Falcon alias at the time. She immobilized both of them and made off with Vulture's loot.

Trapster appears as a member of the female incarnation of the Sinister Syndicate where she was called "Trapstr". While on her cellphone, she quotes that there is no E in her name as she is still trying to decide on replacing it with the letter A. The Sinister Syndicate begins their mission where they attack the F.E.A.S.T. building that Boomerang is volunteering at. Beetle leads the Sinister Syndicate in attacking Boomerang. After getting Aunt May to safety, Peter Parker changes into Spider-Man and helps Boomerang fight the Syndicate. The Syndicate starts doing their formation attack until Spider-Man accidentally sets off Boomerang's gaserang which knocks out Spider-Man enough for the Syndicate to make off with Boomerang. Trapstr's paste was used to trap Boomerang in their headquarters. When Beetle returns to the headquarters, Trapstr is present when Mayor Wilson Fisk brings the full force of New York City to their headquarters demanding that they surrender Boomerang to him. She wonders if an attractive police officer named Rob is down there. Trapstr later stated that she learned about Beetle's boyfriend Randy Robertson by hacking her e-mails. The Syndicate then assists Spider-Man against Mayor Fisk's forces. After Spider-Man evacuates Boomerang, the Syndicate fights Mayor Fisk's forces while not killing them. The Syndicate is defeated and arrested by the police. Their transport is then attacked by an unknown assailant who frees them.

Other versions

Marvel 1602
A variation on the Trapster appears in 1602: Fantastick Four as one of the members of the 1602 Frightful Four: "The Four who are Frightful". He is an expert huntsman, hence his name.

Spider-Ham
Peter appears as a bird called Paste Pot Peep in Peter Porker, the Spectacular Spider-Ham #16.

In other media
 The Peter Petruski incarnation of Trapster appears in The New Fantastic Four episode "The Frightful Four", voiced by Gene Moss. This version uses complex traps instead of super adhesives and is a member of the Wizard's Frightful Four.
 The Peter Petruski incarnation of Trapster appears in the Fantastic Four episode "And the Wind Cries Medusa", voiced by Beau Weaver. This version is a member of the Wizard's Frightful Four.
 The Peter Petruski incarnation of Trapster appears in the Fantastic Four: World's Greatest Heroes episode "Frightful", voiced by Sam Vincent. This version is a member of the Wizard's Frightful Four.
 Peter Petruski / Paste-Pot Pete appears in The Super Hero Squad Show, voiced by Dave Boat. This version is a member of Doctor Doom's Lethal Legion and briefly joins Pyro and Zzzax to form Team Toxic.
 The Peter Petruski incarnation of Trapster appears in Ultimate Spider-Man, voiced by Steven Weber. This version is a member of the Frightful Four.
 The Peter Petruski incarnation of Trapster makes a non-speaking cameo appearance in the Avengers Assemble episode "The Avengers Protocol: Part 1".

References

External links
 Trapster at Marvel.com

Comics characters introduced in 1963
Characters created by Jack Kirby
Characters created by Stan Lee
Fictional characters from Indiana
Fictional chemists
Fictional inventors
Fictional mercenaries in comics
Marvel Comics scientists
Marvel Comics supervillains